"Miseinen" (Underage) is Jun Shibata's 8th single. It was released on January 28, 2004 and peaked at #20.

Track listing
Miseinen (未成年; Miseinen)
Shiawase na uta (幸せなうた; Happy Song)
 ~ Piano Solo~ (サーカスがやってきた ～Piano Solo～; The Circus Has Arrived: Piano Solo)

Charts

External links
https://web.archive.org/web/20161030094458/http://www.shibatajun.com/— Shibata Jun Official Website

2004 singles
Jun Shibata songs
2004 songs